Beaver Glacier is a glacier,  long, draining the coastal mountains of the Queen Alexandra Range just northwest of Mount Fox and entering the Ross Ice Shelf at McCann Point. It was named by the New Zealand Geological Survey Antarctic Expedition (1959–60) after the Beaver aircraft City of Auckland, which crashed in this area in January 1960.

See also
 List of glaciers in the Antarctic
 Glaciology

References
 

Glaciers of Shackleton Coast